Omega Tribe Groove is a compilation and remix album by Kiyotaka Sugiyama & Omega Tribe, released by VAP on January 30, 2019. The album was produced by former composer Tetsuji Hayashi, lead singer Kiyotaka Sugiyama and former arranger Ken Shiguma for the 35th anniversary last year as well as the start of the band's Last Live Tour the next week. The remixes were handled by producers KAZ, Kawaguchi Daisuke and Jun Abe with the compilation being supervised by Hayashi and Shiguma. The album charted at No. 46 in the Oricon charts.

Background and composition 
Each disc includes a special track: the first including "Nori Okureta 747," a song from the band's predecessor Cutie Panchos, and the second including the first take of "Kimi no Heart wa Marine Blue." The cover is based on the cover of the band's first album Aqua City, both being taken at Waikiki, Hawaii of the Hyatt Regency Waikiki, Aston Waikiki, ‘Alohilani and adjacent resorts.

The album was announced on January 9, 2019 on Sugiyama's website Island Afternoon as well as on the official VAP website.

Track listing

Charts

References 

2019 remix albums
2019 albums